Neném is a nickname. It may refer to:

 Neném (beach soccer) (born 1973), Carlos Alberto Lisboa, Brazilian beach soccer player and football forward
 Neném (footballer, born 1986), Jose Maria Carneiro Da Silva, Brazilian football midfielder